The 6th West Virginia Cavalry Regiment was a cavalry regiment that served in the Union Army during the American Civil War.

Service
The 6th West Virginia Cavalry Regiment was organized from the 3rd West Virginia Infantry Regiment on January 26, 1864. The regiment absorbed the remaining battalion of the 5th West Virginia Cavalry Regiment on December 14, 1864.

The 6th West Virginia Cavalry Regiment mustered out at Fort Leavenworth, Kansas, on May 22, 1866.

Casualties
The 6th West Virginia Cavalry Regiment suffered 5 officers and 28 enlisted men killed or mortally wounded in battle and 2 officers and 201 enlisted men dead from disease for a total of 236 fatalities.

Commanders
 Colonel David T. Hewes (Dismissed February 15, 1864)
 Lt. Colonel Frank W. Thompson

See also
West Virginia Units in the Civil War
West Virginia in the Civil War

References
The Civil War Archive

Further reading 

 
 

Units and formations of the Union Army from West Virginia
1864 establishments in West Virginia
Military units and formations established in 1864
Military units and formations disestablished in 1866